The 20861/20862 Puri–Ahmedabad Weekly Express is an Express train belonging to East Coast Railway zone that runs between  and  in India. It is currently being operated with 18405/18406 train numbers on a weekly basis.

Service

The 18405/Puri–Ahmedabad Express has an average speed of 54 km/hr and covers 1995 km in 37h 5m. The 18406/Ahmedabad–Puri Express has an average speed of 52 km/hr and covers 1995 km in 38h 10m.

Route & halts

The important halts of the train are:

Coach composition

The train has standard LHB rakes with a max speed of 110 kmph. The train consists of 22 coaches:
 1 AC II Tier
 3 AC III Tier
 9 Sleeper coaches
 1 Pantry car
 6 General Unreserved
 2 End-on Generator

Traction

It is hauled by a Visakhapatnam Loco Shed / Vadodara Loco Shed-based WAP-7 electric locomotive on its entire journey.

Rake sharing 

The train shares its rake with 12887/12888 Puri–Howrah Express.

Direction reversal

The train reverses its direction twice:

See also 
 Puri railway station
 Ahmedabad Junction railway station
 Puri–Howrah Express

Notes

References

External links 
 18405/Puri–Ahmedabad Express India Rail Info
 18406/Ahmedabad–Puri Express India Rail Info

Transport in Puri
Transport in Ahmedabad
Rail transport in Odisha
Rail transport in Chhattisgarh
Rail transport in Maharashtra
Rail transport in Gujarat
Express trains in India